The Punjabi Party of Malaysia (abbreviated as PPM) is a Malaysian political party formed in 1986 but only successfully registered in 2003 to represent the interests of Malaysian Indian Punjabi community. It is the only party in Malaysia founded specifically with the interests of Punjabi people in Malaysia as its mission. The party also champion the rights of the Sikh religious belief. Before the fall of Barisan Nasional (BN) in the 2018 general election, PPM was considered pro-BN and had been trying to join the previous governing coalition.

President
 Jeswant Singh (1986–2002)
 Prof. Dato Dr. Gurdeep Perkash Singh (2002–2010)
 Susheel Kaur (2010–2013)
 Datuk Gurjeet Singh Rhande (23 November 2013 - current)

General election results

See also
List of political parties in Malaysia
Politics of Malaysia

References

External links
 Official website
 

Political parties in Malaysia
Political parties established in 1986
1986 establishments in Malaysia
Conservative parties in Malaysia
Political parties of minorities
Identity politics
Indian-Malaysian culture
Punjabi diaspora in Malaysia